Bickley is an area of London, England.

Bickley may also refer to:

Bickley (band), a punk rock band from Houston, Texas
Bickley, Cheshire, England
Bickley, Georgia, United States
Bickley (surname)
Bickley, Western Australia, Australia
Bickley, Worcestershire, a location in England
Bickley baronets, a title in the Baronetage of England

See also 
 Bickle (disambiguation)